Panorama, stylized as [panorama], is the second studio album of the Filipino band, 6cyclemind. It has 16 tracks and released under Musiko Records & Sony BMG Music Entertainment (Philippines), Inc.in 2005.

Track listing and duration

Notes
The album reached Gold status in no time, spearheaded by the two early singles: "Sandalan" and "I"
The most critically acclaimed album of the band

Personnel
 Ney Dimaculangan - Lead Vocals
 Rye Sarmiento - Guitars
 Chuck Isidro - Lead Guitars
 Bob Cañamo - bass
 Wendell Garcia / Melvin Macalinao - drums & percussion

Additional Musician:
Guest Vocals on "Di Tayo Titigil" by: Ebe Dancel of Sugarfree
Guest Vocals on "Umaasa" by: Francis Magalona

Album Credits
Executive Producer for Soupstar Entertainment Inc. : Chuck Isidro and Buddy Zabala
Executive Producer for Soupstar Entertainment Inc. : Chuck Isidro
Executive Producers for BMG Records Pilipinas: Rudy Y. Tee
A & R Direction: Vic Valenciano
Album Design and Photography: John Ed De Vera and Wincy Aquino Ong
Recorded At: TRACKS Studios by Angee Rozul
Album Mix: Angee Rozul

References

6cyclemind albums
2005 albums